GHEX can refer to

 ground-coupled heat exchanger
 Global Home Education Exchange